Civica Rx is a nonprofit generic drug company founded in 2018 by national philanthropies and leading U.S. health systems to reduce and prevent drug shortages in the United States and the price spikes that can accompany them.

Civica's mission is to make quality generic medicines accessible and affordable to everyone. Civica's business model is based on the Healthcare Utility concept. 

The drugs Civica makes are identified and prioritized by member health systems' doctors, hospital pharmacists and clinicians as the medications most important for quality patient care. While serving 55 health systems and 1,500 hospitals (or 1/3 of all licensed U.S. hospital beds), Civica also supplies the U.S. Department of Veterans Affairs, the U.S. Department of Defense, and “340B” hospitals caring for vulnerable patients in some of the country’s most underserved areas. As of January 2022, Civica provided nearly 70 million vials of essential medicines, enough to treat over 26 million patients across the United States. These numbers continue to grow as Civica moves from a start-up to a well-established societal asset, serving more patients every day. Most recently, eleven of Civica's 55+ medications are being used to help COVID-19 patients, including neuromuscular blocking agents, sedation agents and pain management medications for patients on ventilators.

Civica plans to bring over 100 medications to market by 2023 through various manufacturing approaches such as partnerships, developing ANDAs, and building its own manufacturing capability. On January 21, 2021, the company announced its plans to build a 120,000 square-foot sterile injectable manufacturing facility in Petersburg, Virginia, representing a $124.5 million investment.

The first shipment of Civica private-label medication was vancomycin, delivered to Riverton Hospital, a part of Civica founder health system Intermountain Healthcare, in October 2019. As of January 2022, Civica provided approximately 70 million vials or syringes of essential generic medications to hospitals, which have been used to treat approximately 26 million patients.

Partnerships and deals
In January 2021, Civica Rx announced its plans to build an essential medicines manufacturing facility in Virginia, part of a partnership with Virginia-based Phlow Corp to produce sterile injectable medications used in hospitals for COVID-19 patient care, emergency room and intensive-care unit treatments, surgeries, and to treat other serious conditions. Civica is a key collaborator in the U.S. government-funded partnership with Phlow Corp, Medicines for All Institute at Virginia Commonwealth University and AMPAC Fine Chemicals.

In 2020, Civica and 18 Blue Cross Blue Shield plans announced an initiative to lower the cost of certain high-priced generic drugs for consumers at the pharmacy counter. Anthem, Inc. has since joined this new entity called "CivicaScript," which expects to launch its first lower cost generics in late 2022. 

In March 2023, California Gov. Gavin Newsom (D) announced a $50M 10-year deal with Civica to provide affordable insulin (vials and pre-filled pen cartridges) to residents, part of the state's broader CalRx initiative to offer prescription drugs at low cost for all Californians.

References

Pharmaceutical companies of the United States
American companies established in 2018
Non-profit organizations based in the United States
Generic drug manufacturers